Hednota pedionoma is a moth of the family Crambidae described by Edward Meyrick in 1885. It is found in Western Australia, South Australia, Tasmania and Victoria.

The wingspan is about 20 mm.

The larvae feed on various cereals in the family Poaceae.

External links
Australian Faunal Directory
Australian Insects

Crambinae
Moths of Australia
Moths described in 1885